Asperula sintenisii is a species of flowering plant in the family Rubiaceae.

Description 
Asperula sintenisii was first described in 1890 and is endemic to Greece.

References

sintenisii
Flora of Greece
Taxa named by Paul Friedrich August Ascherson
Taxa named by Joseph Friedrich Nicolaus Bornmüller